Air Kaikoura is a small New Zealand airline offering scheduled flights with light aircraft between Kaikōura and Wellington. It also operates charter services around New Zealand. The company was founded in 1983. They saw the potential with Whale watching fights and started offering services using a Piper PA-28 Cherokee and Cessna 206.

Services 
Following the 2016 Kaikōura earthquake with road access closed, Air Kaikoura saw the need to help out the region's isolation from the rest of New Zealand. From 4 December 2017 the airline started a shuttle service to Parikawa to allow locals to access the area.
Air Kaikoura launched its first scheduled service to Wellington on 15 May 2020 using a GA-8 Airvan which can take seven passengers. The duration of the flight is 50 minutes. The airline is also looking at serving Blenheim.

Fleet
As of November 2020 the Air Kaikoura fleet consists of the following aircraft:

References 

Airlines of New Zealand
Kaikōura District